The American Journal of Public Health is a monthly peer-reviewed public health journal published by the American Public Health Association that covers health policy and public health. The journal was established in 1911 and its stated mission is "to advance public health research, policy, practice, and education." The journal occasionally publishes themed supplements. The editor-in-chief is Alfredo Morabia.

Reception
The journal was voted one of the 100 most influential journals in biology and medicine over the last 100 years by the Special Libraries Association. According to the Journal Citation Reports, the journal has a 2019 impact factor of 6.464.

Abstracting and indexing 
The journal is abstracted and indexed in:

See also
Progress in Community Health Partnerships

References

External links

Public health journals
Publications established in 1911
Monthly journals
English-language journals
Academic journals published by learned and professional societies of the United States